The 1999–2000 St. John's Red Storm men's basketball team represented St. John's University during the 1999–2000 NCAA Division I men's basketball season. The team was coached by Mike Jarvis in his second year at the school. St. John's home games are played at Alumni Hall and Madison Square Garden and the team is a member of the Big East Conference.

Off season

Departures

Transfer addition

Class of 1999 signees

Roster

Schedule and results

|-
!colspan=9 style="background:#FF0000; color:#FFFFFF;"| Exhibition

|-
!colspan=9 style="background:#FF0000; color:#FFFFFF;"| Non-conference regular season

|-
!colspan=9 style="background:#FF0000; color:#FFFFFF;"| Big East Conference regular season

|-
!colspan=9 style="background:#FF0000; color:#FFFFFF;"| Big East tournament

|-
!colspan=9 style="background:#FF0000; color:#FFFFFF;"| NCAA tournament

Team players drafted into the NBA

References

St. John's Red Storm men's basketball seasons
St. John's
St. John's
St John
St John